Planken is a municipality in Oberland, Liechtenstein. It has four exclaves, two enclaves and a population of 473. Thus by population it is the smallest municipality of Liechtenstein.

Geography 
It is located on the western slope of Drei Schwestern. The center of the main village is on 786m a.s.l.. Additionally the plateau of Oberplanken belongs to the municipality. Its borders on Gamprin's exclave Nendler Berg, the Vaduz' exclave Dachsegg and Eschen in the North, on the Austrian municipality of Frastanz in the East and on Schaan in the South and in the West.

The exclave Plankner Garselli is a former alp in the Samina valley. The Plankner Neugrütt is a cliffy forest north of the village, separated from it by a stripe of 20m of land and surrounded by an exclave of Schaan with the same name. The other two exclaves are in the Rhine Valley; Wes is a small meadow and Riet-Äscher is a marsh, both are surrounded by territory of Schaan.

Furthermore, there are two enclaves consisting of woods; Rüttistein that belongs to Vaduz and Schaan's Brunnenegg.

Alps 
There are four alps in the municipality:

The alp Gafadura on the western slope of Drei Schwestern was settled by Walser, alike Saroja, from Triesenberg and inhabited until the 15th century. In 1579 the owners of Gafadura, Gaflonen (today: Alpzinka) and Garselli handed their former cooperative alps over to the municipality. It was first given to single farmers until 1875 when it became a communal farming project until 1960. Since then its use is limited to cattle farming and the forestry industry. The Gafadura chalet was built 1926 as a princely hunting lodge and taken over by the Liechtensteiner Alpenverein in 1968.

Alpzinka was first mentioned in 1428 and was probably settled until the mid-15th century. Since then this area belonging to Gafadura was used for agriculture.

Rütti, formerly also known as "Maiasäss" was used as a Maiensäss for Gafadura.

Plankner Garselli is located in the western Samina Valley. The use of this steep and dry alp was not intensive since the 19th century and was limited to cattle. The agricultural activity ceased between 1880 and 1890. Since 2000 it is part of the Natural Forest Reserve Garselli/Zigerberg.

History
The Romanic population from Schaan and Vaduz had already cleared the area of the village before the Walser migrated there in the 13th century and started clearing the upper parts of the municipality. The first documented naming was in the year 1361. The village was looted twice, first by the Swiss in 1499 when they campaigned against Frastanz and in 1799 by the French when they ousted the Austrian forces during the Napoleonic Wars.

In 1868 the village was connected to the rest of Liechtenstein via road, making it reachable for bigger carriages. After a great conflagration in 1869 an exodus hit the village; in 1901 just 56 inhabitants remained. The situation improved due to a land reform from 1961 to 1981 and an enlargement of infrastructure.

Politics 
The community leader since 2007 is Rainer Beck (VU). In the 2015 regional elections, he received 67.3% of the valid votes.

In the communal council, four seats are held by FBP and three by VU.

Sights 
Its most notable structure is an eighteenth-century chapel St. Josef, which belongs to the parish of Schaan. It is supposed to have been built in 1761 and in 1861 a tower was added that contains a bell from 1724. 1929 Prince Franz I. founded the chapel's three baroque revival altars. It was then redesigned in 1955 under the supervision of architect Felix Schmid of Rapperswil.

Notable people
 Hanni Wenzel, alpine skier
 Andreas Wenzel, alpine skier
 Petra Wenzel, alpine skier
 Tina Weirather, alpine skier
 Jessica Walter, alpine skier

Gallery

References

External links

Official website

Municipalities of Liechtenstein